The 2021–22 season is the 25th season in the existence of MFK Karviná and the club's 15th consecutive season in the top flight of Czech football. In addition to the domestic league, MFK Karviná are participating in this season's edition of the Czech Cup.

Players

First-team squad

Out on loan

Transfers

Pre-season and friendlies

Competitions

Overall record

Czech First League

League table

Results summary

Results by round

Matches

Czech Cup

References

MFK Karviná seasons
Karvina